Jalal Bazzaz is a Lebanon international rugby league footballer who last played as a  forward for the St George Illawarra Dragons in the NSW Cup.

Career
Bazzaz made his international debut for Lebanon in their 56–14 loss to Fiji in the 2019 Pacific Test.

References

External links
Lebanon Cedars International profile

Living people
Australian people of Italian descent
Australian people of Lebanese descent
Sportspeople of Lebanese descent
Lebanon national rugby league team captains
Lebanon national rugby league team players
Rugby league locks
Year of birth missing (living people)